The Murder Men (later presented as an episode of the TV show Cain's Hundred which was called Blues for a Junkman, in 1962) is a 1961 film starring Peter Mark Richman, James Coburn, and Dorothy Dandridge.

Plot
Norma Sherman, is a night-club singer and addict who, upon being released from jail, attempts to win back the love of her husband.

Cast
Mark Richman as Nick Cain
James Coburn as Arthur Troy
Dorothy Dandridge as Norma Sherman
Joe Mantell as Maury Troy
Ivan Dixon as Joe Sherman
Ed Asner as Dave Keller

Reviews
One commentator called Dorothy Dandridge's role in this film "one of (her) most interesting late performances".  This was her last film.

References

External links

Metro-Goldwyn-Mayer films
Films directed by John Peyser